The Bank of St Helena is a government-owned bank based in the British Overseas Territory of Saint Helena, Ascension and Tristan da Cunha. It operates branches on St Helena and Ascension Island. The Government of St. Helena owns 100% of the bank and operates it as a parastatal. The governor appoints the board of directors. The bank holds deposits of around SHP 73.2 million. On the asset side, lending accounts for SHP 16.5 million, and SHP 56.5 million is invested.

Services
The bank offers both current and savings accounts to personal customers, as well as business banking from its two offices, one in Jamestown, Saint Helena, and the other in Georgetown, Ascension Island.

The bank also offers services to tourists and others visiting Saint Helena and Ascension Island. These include currency exchange, encashment of traveller's cheques and providing cash advances on selected credit/debit cards.

The bank maintains a relationship with Lloyds Bank, allowing its customers to use their banking network for United Kingdom and international money transmission.

Current details of the bank's services are available on its website.

Money and banking on Saint Helena
The Currency Commissioners, part of the Government of Saint Helena, issue the island's banknotes and coins. The Bank of St Helena is the island's only bank and the island does not have a central bank. The bank sets its own deposit and lending rates. As of April 2019 the maximum savings rate is 4% and the normal personal lending rate is 7%.

Local Debit Cards

Launched in 2017, Local Debit Cards are the easiest way to shop around St Helena without withdrawing cash. The cards have QR codes linked to the user's account and spending is debited instantly from the bank account. The cards are not accepted in all shops and stores around St Helena, but are available to use in the large shopping outlets and most small businesses found around the island.

Local Debit Cards are only available to customers with a personal or business current account, and are free of charge.

Online Banking
Launched in 2013, online banking allows account holders to download statements, make local and international transfers, and set-up monthly journals. Online banking is available to personal account holders for £2 a month and to business account holders for £5 or £30 a month (depending on the package they choose).

History
The Banking Ordinance 2003 and the Bank of St Helena Ordinance 2003 established the bank on 1 April 2004. The bank inherited the assets and liabilities of the Government Savings Bank (in Saint Helena) and the Ascension Island Savings Bank.

The Government Savings Bank in St Helena had been established in 1865.

The bank's first manager was Richard Winch. The full list of managers is as follows:

References

External links
 
 Government of St. Helena

Banks of the United Kingdom
Economy of Saint Helena
Banks established in 2004
Organisations based in Saint Helena
2004 establishments in Saint Helena and Dependencies
Jamestown, Saint Helena